The 2022–23 Wyoming Cowboys basketball team represented the University of Wyoming during the 2022–23 NCAA Division I men's basketball season. The Cowboys were led by third-year head coach Jeff Linder and played their home games for the 41st season at Arena-Auditorium in Laramie, Wyoming. They participated as members of the Mountain West Conference for the 24th season.

Previous season 
The Cowboys finished the 2021–22 season 25–9, 13–5 in Mountain West play to finish in fourth place. In the Mountain West tournament, the Cowboys defeated UNLV in the quarterfinals before losing to Boise State. The Cowboys received an at-large bid to the NCAA Tournament for the first time since 2015 as a No. 12 seed. They were defeated by Indiana in the First Four.  

The team also spent time ranked in the AP Poll for the first time since 2015. They were ranked #22 for the week of February 14.

Offseason

Departures

Incoming transfers

2022 recruiting class

Roster

Statistics

Preseason

Greek Tour 
The team went on a 10-day foreign tour of Greece from July 24 to August 4. NCAA rules allow programs to take international tours once every 4 years; this was the programs' first since 2016-17.

The Cowboys participated in 3 exhibition games, winning all 3. While in Athens, the team faced Panerythraikos B.C. on July 27 and Panathinaikos Select on July 28. They then traveled to Patras and faced off against Promitheas Patras B.C. on July 30.

In addition, the team participated in a variety of sightseeing and team-building exercises.

Schedule and results 

|-
!colspan=12 style=| Non-conference regular season

|-
!colspan=12 style=| Mountain West regular season

 

  

  
  
 
|-
!colspan=12 style=| Mountain West tournament

Source

References 

Wyoming
Wyoming Cowboys basketball seasons
Run